On 22 April 2022 at 23:07 local time (CEST, 21:07 UTC), a magnitude 5.7 earthquake struck southern Bosnia and Herzegovina. It is the country's fifth largest earthquake, as well as its most significant since the 1969 Banja Luka earthquake.

Earthquake 
According to the Federal Hydrometeorological Service of Bosnia and Herzegovina (FHMZ BiH), the earthquake had a magnitude of 5.6 and a maximum Mercalli intensity of VIII (Severe) and occurred near Stolac. The USGS rated the earthquake at magnitude 5.7. They reported that it occurred 14 km north-northeast of Ljubinje at a depth of 10 km. According to the Croatian Seismological Service, the epicentre was near Ljubinje, the magnitude was 6.1 on the Richter scale, and the intensity was VIII (Heavily Damaging) on the European macroseismic scale (EMS-98).

Outside the epicentral area, the earthquake was felt strongly in Bosnia and Herzegovina's capital, Sarajevo, Montenegro's capital, Podgorica, and the Croatian region of Dalmatia. It was felt in much of southern Croatia, Montenegro, and also parts of Slovenia, Serbia, Albania, Kosovo, North Macedonia, Italy and northern Greece.

Impact 
A 28-year-old woman was fatally injured after a boulder rolled down a hill and crashed through the roof of a house in Stolac, and died in hospital during attempted resuscitation. Her parents were hospitalised with light injuries. An official day of mourning was declared in Stolac for 24 April. Eight other people were injured, several while panicking due to the earthquake. As of 29 April, 300 households in Stolac have reported damage. The town school was among the damaged buildings.

The Municipality of Berkovići, where the epicentre lies, briefly lost power due to the earthquake. Herzegovina-Neretva Canton civil defence reported rockfalls on roads from Stolac to Mostar, Neum, Ljubinje and Berkovići. Numerous streets in Stolac and one in Mostar were blocked by fallen bricks, roof tiles and plaster. In Čapljina, several parked cars were damaged by debris falling from buildings. Four people were injured in Čapljina.

Several miners in a coal mine near Sarajevo sustained light injuries, four requiring medical attention. In Croatia, damage was caused to eleven buildings, including the Franciscan Church and a school in Dubrovnik. Small landslides also occurred on the Adriatic Highway in Župa dubrovačka and near Slivno. In Montenegro, traffic on the Belgrade–Bar railway was interrupted.

An aftershock measuring 4.8 struck on 24 April with an intensity of VI (Strong) on the Modified Mercalli Intensity Scale, causing further damage to buildings, including a 19th-century Austro-Hungarian military barracks building.

See also

List of earthquakes in 2022
List of earthquakes in Bosnia and Herzegovina
List of earthquakes in Balkan
Other significantly damaging earthquakes that affected the Balkan peninsula:
1927 Ljubinje earthquake
1979 Montenegro earthquake
1996 Ston–Slano earthquake
2002 Kosovo earthquake
2010 Serbia earthquake
2019 Albania earthquake
2020 Petrinja earthquake

References

External links 
 Earthquake caught on air on a Montenegrin TV station
Compilation of footages that show the moment the quake hit and its aftermath

Bosnia and Herzegovina
Earthquakes in Bosnia and Herzegovina
Earthquakes in Croatia
2022 in Bosnia and Herzegovina
Bosnia and Herzegovina earthquake
History of Herzegovina
2022 disasters in Europe